Valentín Arredondo (born February 13, 1989, in Ahome, Sinaloa) is a retired Mexican professional footballer who played for Murciélagos  of Ascenso MX.

External links

References

1989 births
Living people
People from Ahome Municipality
Footballers from Sinaloa
Murciélagos FC footballers
Liga MX players
Association football defenders
Mexican footballers